Rostov Arena is an association football stadium in Rostov-on-Don, Russia. It was one of the venues for the 2018 FIFA World Cup. It also hosts FC Rostov of the Russian Premier League, replacing Olimp – 2. It has a capacity of 45,000 spectators.

History

In June 2013, during the groundbreaking for the stadium, five shells from WWII were found, almost perfectly preserved.

In August 2013, work began on the sandy alluvium foundation for the stadium. Work on the foundation was completed in May 2014. Construction commenced on the stadium substructure in October 2015. 
In December the construction site began to bring in heavy equipment and construction materials. In January 2015, crews began driving piles.

In March 2015, the stadium project was revised, reducing the cost of construction to 3 billion rubles. In the summer of 2015 pile driving was completed and superstructure construction began. 

In December 2015, work began on the installation of the metal roof frame. In July 2016 work on the concrete stadium bowl began. In addition, builders started construction of the facade and began landscaping the adjacent territory to the stadium. In November 2016 the reinforced concrete work of the stadium main bowl was fully completed and the installation of load bearing roof structures began. On December 22, 2017 the construction of the stadium was completed. On April 15, 2018 the stadium hosted its first game between FC Rostov and FC SKA-Khabarovsk. The stadium was officially opened on May 13, 2018, with a friendly football match between the FC Rostov and FK Ural.

Design

In 2011, the final design for the new stadium was presented by Populous. The irregular shape of both the roof and stands are distinctive features. Part of the seating is to be temporary, for the 2018 World Cup. After the tournament capacity may be decreased to 42,000. As the main architect for Rostov Region confirmed, this stadium is to be the start of a new city centre. It will be the first large project built on the southern bank of the Don River, with the rest of the city lying north. The total cost of the stadium was 19,84 billion rubles. With shopping and dining destinations, the stadium will serve as a focal point for investments and new developments.

2018 FIFA World Cup
Rostov Arena hosted five games during the 2018 FIFA World Cup.

Other International Soccer Matches

After 2018 FIFA World Cup 
After the 2018 FIFA World Cup, the arena is to be used for the matches of local FC Rostov and for the Russia national football team games, as well as for other sporting and cultural events.

References

External links

Site of stadium Rostov Arena
Rostov 14 seconds
Design renderings at StadiumDB.com Rostov Design renderings at StadiumDB

2018 FIFA World Cup stadiums
Football venues in Russia
Sports venues completed in 2018
2018 establishments in Russia
Sports venues in Rostov-on-Don